The Pepperdine University School of Public Policy (SPP) is a Master of Public Policy (MPP) degree program, located in Malibu, California with summer classes offered in Washington, DC. It is one of four graduate schools at Pepperdine University. The MPP is customized with specializations in Applied Economic Policy, American Policy and Politics, International Relations and National Security, State and Local Policy, and Public Policy Dispute Resolution.

The Master of Public Policy requires 50 units of coursework with four 3- or 4-unit courses each semester for two academic years (four semesters). The first year is primarily composed of core courses and provides a foundation for the student's specialization courses, most of which are taken in the second year.

About
The School of Public Policy enrolls approximately 100 students and offers a Master of Public Policy (MPP) degree built on a distinctive philosophy of nurturing leaders to use the tools of analysis and policy design to effect successful implementation and real change. This requires critical insights balanced with personal moral certainties that only a broad exposure to great ideas, courageous thinkers, and extraordinary leaders can encourage. It prepares graduates for careers as leaders and also seeks to strengthen the institutions which lie between the federal government and the individual, including the family, religious organizations, volunteer associations, local and regional government, and nonprofit organizations.

Pepperdine's School of Public Policy opened in the fall of 1997 with a unique curriculum designed by James Q. Wilson, Jack Kemp, and Michael Novak, as a response to many of the government-centric policy programs of the time. Because of these beginnings, Pepperdine offers students a comprehensive curriculum grounded in both policy analysis and an understanding of the many factors—cultural, historical, and constitutional—that affect the implementation of public policy. The current dean of the Public Policy School is Pete N. Peterson. The current Dean Emeritus of the School of Public Policy is James Wilburn.

The School of Public Policy offers two Washington, DC Policy Scholars Program sessions at the centrally-located Washington, DC, campus. Each session is a four-week, 3-credit seminar. Past seminar topics include,"American Grand Strategies in International Relations: From the American Revolution to President Trump," "Roots of American Order: Thinking Historically About Public Policy," "American Gospel: The Role of Religion in US Domestic and Foreign Policy," and "Humanizing Education Policy: A Study of Foundational Philosophies."

Intensive Professional Learning Components

In addition to regular credit courses, each student is required to complete professional experiences, which are critical to developing leadership in real-world situations. Students must participate in a series of professional development experiences each semester, complete a mandatory Policy Internship, and complete a capstone project which will be developed during the final semester’s Policy Research Seminar (Capstone) for credit. This project may be presented to a board of academic and real-world practitioners and provides another assessment of individual progress in developing leadership skills and personal values. This major policy analysis, undertaken with a member of the faculty or a committee of faculty and board of visitors, is designed to provide focus and fuel for successful undertakings and to assist students with career planning.

The School of Public Policy hosts a range of professional development events throughout the academic year. These co-curricular activities are
intended to provide both career-oriented professional preparation in areas such as job search strategies, career development, and networking as well as hands-on opportunities to interact with leading scholars and practitioners in the field of public policy.

Policy Internships
Students are required to complete 240-hour Policy Internship in an agency or organization related to the student’s area of specialization and must be completed prior to the second semester of the second year. Such agencies may be in local, state, or federal government; nonprofit organizations; the private sector; or an international experience in a non-US setting to prepare for foreign service after graduation. The internship provides a perspective on how the methods and theories learned in the cases studied in the classroom may find practical expression in non-textbook and complex real-life settings. It is expected that most students will complete their Policy Internship during the summer between the first and second years, although provisions are made to allow it to overlap the academic year.

Joint Degree Programs
Joint degree programs include the MPP/Juris Doctor degree in conjunction with the Pepperdine Rick J. Caruso School of Law, the MPP/Masters of Dispute Resolution degree in conjunction with the School of Law's number one ranked Straus Institute for Dispute Resolution and the MPP/MBA degree in conjunction with the Pepperdine Graziadio Business School.

Davenport Institute for Public Engagement and Civic Leadership 
The Davenport Institute for Public Policy was founded in 1996 and in 2010 partnered with the nonprofit, multi-partisan organization Common Sense California to become the Davenport Institute for Public Engagement and Civic Leadership. The mission of the institute is to help build stronger communities in California by promoting public participation in local governance. The institute has trained thousands of local government staff, elected officials, and police officers in California and across the country and has provided technical support to more than 50 cities. More than 100 practitioners have also completed the institute’s Professional Certificate in Advanced Public Engagement for Local Government. Hosted on the Malibu campus, this unique program offers a deep dive into the context, purpose, and best practices for engaging residents in the decisions that affect their lives and communities.

Through continued course work and work-study opportunities, the Davenport Institute provides current SPP students with the skills, experience, and relationships they will need to work toward common-sense answers to today’s difficult policy problems. The institute has been instrumental in developing the School of Public Policy’s student chapter of the International City/County Management Association (ICMA), only the second such chapter in California, as well as in facilitating the annual City Manager in Residence program. The institute is affiliated with the following networks and associations: Bridge Alliance, California Consortium on Public Engagement, National Civility Network, National Conference on Citizenship, and the University Network for Collaborative Government.

In 2000 the Institute was named in honor of David Davenport, the university’s sixth president, and an endowment of $3 million was established.

The American Project at the School of Public Policy 
"The American Project: On the Future of Conservatism" is a multi-year program to propel innovative ideas for reimagining the future of America's conservative movement. Launched in early 2017, the “Project” gathers leading academics, activists and academics to explore the future of the conservative movement. Through events and an essay series featured on the website RealClearPolicy, the American Project argues for a reimagined communitarian conservatism in policy and politics. The American Project is led by SPP Dean Pete Peterson, and co-director, Rich Tafel.

Homeland Security Advisory Council at the Pepperdine School of Public Policy 
The Homeland Security Advisory Council at the Pepperdine School of Public Policy (HSAC@SPP) is an innovative academic enterprise focusing on disaster preparedness, crisis management, and resiliency through engaging the public, private, and civic sectors. Formed in partnership with the renowned Los Angeles Homeland Security Advisory Council, HSAC@SPP is the latest addition to the SPP's robust cross-sector initiatives, positioned to prepare the current and next generation of leaders by exploring a full range of cross-sector and information technology solutions to public policy challenges.

HSAC currently offers a variety of programs focused on technology, engagement, capability building, and partnerships for crisis managers, policymakers, and public safety professionals, in addition to students pursuing a graduate degree. Through the partnership, HSAC@SPP will expand its current offerings, create new educational and training programs, and reach a broader participant group that includes graduate students and audiences throughout California and the nation.

Education Policy & Impact Initiative 
The Education Policy and Impact initiative based at the SPP is a multi-year initiative intended to both prepare policy leaders as it engages current policymakers in civil discussions about the future of America's education system. Launched in the fall of 2019, this program builds upon the existing work SPP has undertaken in coursework, research, and public events. Led by noted education reform leader Hanna Skandera, who teaches a class at the policy school, the Initiative convenes policy leaders around the year in events and webinars.

School of Public Policy Events
The School of Public Policy is host to several noteworthy visiting scholars, public- and private-sector officials, and policy leaders, providing students the chance to interact with those responsible for shaping policy in their respective fields.

Featured events include:

A Way Forward, Celebrating 20 Years of the School of Public Policy,
Featured Speaker: US Senator Benjamin E. Sasse of Nebraska
Ronald Reagan Presidential Library
Evening Conversations in Washington DC:The Moral Sense in Politics and Policy,
Past Speakers Include: Rod Dreher, Journalist; Ronald C. White, Author and Historian; Andy Crouch, Author; Joe Loconte, Associate Professor of History, Kings College
Patricia Tagliaferri Dean's Distinguished Lecture Series,
Featured Speakers Include: Dr. Niall Ferguson, Senior Fellow at the Hoover Institution, Stanford University; Dr. Charles Murray, American political scientist, writer, and public speaker; Dennis Prager; Secretary of Education Betsy DeVos; and Dr. Victor Davis Hanson,  Martin and Illie Anderson Senior Fellow in Residence in Classics and Military History at the Hoover Institution, Stanford University
Wilburn Distinguished Lecture Series in Politics and Policy,
Featured Speaker: Andrew Roberts, Visiting Professor, War Studies Department, Kings College
 Charles & Rosemary Licata Lecture, Featured Speakers Include: Dr. Jeffrey Sikkenga, Spring 2018 William E. Simon Distinguished Visiting Professor, School of Public Policy; Dr. Gordon Lloyd, Senior Fellow at the Ashbrook Center and the Dockson Professor Emeritus of Public Policy at Pepperdine; Dr. Joseph Loconte, associate professor of history, The King's College, New York; Edward J. Larson, University Professor of History and Darling Chair in Law, Pepperdine University
Viewpoint Diversity in American Higher Education: How Far Left to Go?,
Past Speakers Include: Jon Shields, Associate Professor, Claremont McKenna College; Samual J. Abrama, American Enterprise Institute; Gerard Alexander, University of Virginia; Eliot Cohen, Johns Hopkins School of Advanced International Studies; James Gimpel, University of Maryland, Samuel Goldman, The George Washington University

Honor Society
The School of Public Policy has a chapter of the Pi Alpha Alpha Honor Society.  Pi Alpha Alpha is the National Honor Society for Public Affairs and Administration which was created to recognize and promote excellence in the study and practice of public affairs and administration.

Affiliations
Institutional Member:
 The Association for Public Policy Analysis and Management
 The National Association for Schools of Public Affairs and Administration
 The Public Policy and International Affairs Fellowship Program
 Associate of Professional Schools of International Affairs
 Public Interest Technology University Network 
 University Network for Collaborative Governance

Partners
The School of Public Policy is a student recruiting partner with: 
Council for Christian Colleges & Universities (CCCU)
Young America’s Freedom Foundation (YAF)
Intercollegiate Studies Institute (ISI)
The Fund for American Studies (TFAS)
Public Policy & International Affairs Program (PPIA)
City Year Alumni University Partner
Golden Key International Honour Society
Millennium Momentum Foundation
Rangel International Affairs Program
Teach for America
Training Program Partners:

 International City/County Management Association (ICMA)
 California Police Chiefs Association
 International Association of Government Officials (iGO
 Engaging Local Government Leaders (ELGL)

Distinguished Visiting Faculty
While the faculty of the School of Public Policy is drawn from leading academics and practitioners in the various fields of public policy, a distinctive feature of the school is the use of distinguished public policy scholars, practitioners, and thinkers from around the country to teach and lecture on short-term appointments, bringing their expertise within their discipline to our classrooms. Their contributions add significantly to the richness of the student experience as mentors and advisers, as well as to its comprehensive curriculum, grounded in both policy analysis and an exceptional understanding of the many factors that affect the implementation of public policy.

Notable faculty members who have lectured at the School of Public Policy include: 
Lanhee Chen
Victor Davis Hanson
Steven F. Hayward
Bruce Herschensohn Television and Radio Political Commentator
Angela Hawken
Karen Elliott House
Douglas Kmiec 
Joseph Loconte
Daniel Pipes.
Hanna Skandera
James Q. Wilson (Medal of Freedom Winner)

Notable alumni 

 Alan Beard, Partner at TSG Entertainment
 Lance Christensen, Chief of Staff, California State Senator John Moorlach 
 Tomi Jaiyeola, Head of Programs at Co-creation Hub Nigeria (CcHUB)
 Alma Keshavarz, Postdoctoral Fellow, Institute for Politics & Strategy, Carnegie Mellon University
 David Mansdoerfer, Special Assistant to the President - UNTHSC
 Hattie Mitchell, Founder at Crete Academy Charter School 
 Radu Oprea, Vice President at National Council for SMEs, Romania
 Jason Pates, Senior Consultant, Cisco Systems, Inc.
 Eryn Tillman, Associate Director of the Hoover Institution, Director of Public Affairs
 Andrew Weathers, Lead Public Health Advisor at Centers for Disease Control and Prevention
 Hans Zeiger, Representative for the 25th Legislative District of Washington, is an alumnus of the school.

References

External links

Pepperdine University 
Pepperdine School of Public Policy
Pepperdine University Rick J. Caruso School of Law
Straus Institute for Dispute Resolution
Pepperdine Graziadio Business School

Pepperdine University
Public policy schools
University subdivisions in California